Nyköpings Arenor, Rosvalla is a sports and exhibition centre purely owned by the municipality of Nyköping and managed by Peab on behalf of Nyköping Sports and Exhibition Centre. The stadium includes indoor ice rinks, tennis courts, bowling lanes and a multi-purpose hall for sports, exhibitions and concerts. The facility, which opened in 2003, is home to the clubs; Nyköpings Hockey and Nyköpings BIS.

Major events
The centre has hosted the 'Second Chance' round in the Swedish Melodifestivalen three times, in  2007, 2012 and 2019.

References
 Nyköpings webbplats

External links
 Rosvalla Nyköping Eventcenter

Convention centres in Sweden
Event venues established in 2003
Indoor arenas in Sweden
Indoor ice hockey venues in Sweden
Buildings and structures in Södermanland County
Sports venues completed in 2003